The 2016 Torneo Internazionale Femminile Antico Tiro a Volo was a professional tennis tournament played on outdoor clay courts. It was the eighth edition of the tournament and part of the 2016 ITF Women's Circuit, offering a total of $50,000 in prize money. It took place in Rome, Italy, on 27 June–3 July 2016.

Singles main draw entrants

Seeds 

 1 Rankings as of 20 June 2016.

Other entrants 
The following player received a wildcard into the singles main draw:
  Nastassja Burnett
  Cristiana Ferrando
  Jessica Pieri
  Martina Trevisan

The following players received entry from the qualifying draw:
  Alison Bai
  Martina Di Giuseppe
  Jasmine Paolini
  Lisa Sabino

The following player received entry by a lucky loser spot:
  Martina Spigarelli

Champions

Singles

 Sílvia Soler Espinosa def.  Laura Pous Tió, 2–6, 6–4, 7–5

Doubles

 İpek Soylu /  Xu Shilin def.  Réka Luca Jani /  Sofia Shapatava, 7–5, 6–1

External links 
 2016 Torneo Internazionale Femminile Antico Tiro a Volo at ITFtennis.com

2016 ITF Women's Circuit
2016 in Italian tennis
Tennis tournaments in Italy